Passe-Partout was a Quebec French-language children's television program produced by Radio-Québec (later Télé-Québec) that was originally in production from 1977 to 1993, and was revived in 2019 with a new cast.

It aired on Radio-Québec as well as on Radio-Canada for thirty minutes, incorporating both live actors and puppets although neither group interacted with the other.

History 
When Sesame Street was released in 1969, the possibility of translating it into Quebec French for broadcast in Quebec was considered. However, the conclusion was that Quebec children would not be able to identify with an American television show, and thus the Quebec Minister of Education began investigating the possibility of a children's show shot in the province. After two years (in 1973), the project was handed over to a producer, Laurent Lachance.

However, internal conflict between Lachance and Radio-Québec led to several delays, and ultimately, to Lachance stepping down as producer. The government then turned toward private enterprises, and, on February 14, 1977, contracted JPL Production to produce the show. In its original run episodes were produced only until 1979, which were then repeated on the network until the government announced a new contract to produce 50 more episodes in 1983.

The commentary for the first season's DVD mentions that the Quebec Minister of Education was being pressured to take over the pre-school program as part of the regular program (prématernelle). It reveals that the government, experimentally, opted to invest in a show that could have a comparable outreach for the curriculum for a fraction of the cost of establishing and maintaining an actual educational program of similar content within its school system.

Concept

Live-action segments 
Live action segments usually featured the activities and relationships of several humorous and infantile characters: Passe-Partout (French for "skeleton key" or "master key") (a woman dressed mainly in blue (purple in the reboot) played by Marie Eykel, in the reboot, Elodie Grenier), Passe-Carreau (French for a tailoring device to iron seams) (a woman dressed mainly in yellow (pink in the reboot) played by Claire Pimparé, in the reboot, Gabrielle Fontaine) and Passe-Montagne (French for "balaclava") (a man dressed in brown (red in the reboot) sporting butterfly-shaped bowties played by Jacques L'Heureux, in the reboot, Jean-François  C. Pronovost). 
Other characters that appeared less frequently were André (a young adult male played by André Cartier), Julie (a young adult female played by Jocelyne Goyette), Fardoche (a male farmer played by Pierre Dufresne, in the reboot, Widemir Normil) and Grand-mère (a neighbouring older woman that played grandmother for the actors). The latter would sometime narrate legends (the actress playing Grand-mère, Kim Yaroshevskaya, used to be the hostess of another children show called Fanfreluche where she also acted as a storyteller). In the reboot, she was portrayed by Danielle Proulx. Later in the show's run, the show added two people of colour, a Haitian immigrant named Passe-Tourelle (played by Joujou Turenne) and a Vietnameise character named Passe-Midi (played by Daniel Dõ). In 2019, a completely new character appeared for the reboot series. (Chadi Alhelou as Tancrède).

Apart from the distinctive costumes of the main actors, the live action segments had a surrealistic feel due to the absence of any visible walls: all doors, windows and portraits were seen to hang in mid-air. Whether this was due to budget constraints or artistic choices is unclear.

Segments in this category could either be educational (counting, language skills, memory work, etc.), musical (featuring original songs composed in a traditional folk style), moralistic (personal responsibility), or storytelling.

Puppet segments 
Unlike the live action segments, these were filmed in a realistic environment (although of course scaled down). The various sketches involved the twins Cannelle (girl) and Pruneau (boy). Their stories often featured Perlin and Perline (their parents), grand-papa Bi (their maternal grandfather), Madame Coucou (a single and coquettish neighbour), Rigodon (their same-age male cousin), Ti-Brin (the slightly older bully/bad influence) as well as their classmates: Doualé (a girl from the fictional country of Cantaloupe) and Mélodie (Cannelle's friend who often acted as an object of pity). Another character that never interacted directly with the children (although they often conversed, largely perhaps in the children's imagination) was Alakazou, an anthropomorphic zebra who hosted Cannelle and Pruneau's favourite TV show.

More often than not, the puppet segments dealt with social and moral issues relating to children. In one notable instance, the children's father lost his job and went on extended unemployment benefits, making their future uncertain.

Later in the series run, new puppet characters included Minella, who spoke French with an Italian accent, and Jade and Mirio, who were Vietnamese and Haitian respectively.

In the reboot series, Madame Coucou is a lesbian, Mélodie now as Asian, and A new Haitian character, Kiwi.

Interlude 
Many innovative short films were shown in between segments. These could be anything from animation (a face forming out of vegetable), art (a woman carving a puppet out of an apple) or children's testimonials. Many of these shorts depicted real-life activities that viewing children could either relate to (kids playing) or learn from if they happened to be from the opposite end of the spectrum (city life v. country life). Many also aimed to teach about daily happenings, from going to the dentist, getting x-rays, starting school, playing with friends (or alone), cleaning your bike, or simply going to bed.

While most of these shorts did not involve any of the characters from the other segments, more orchestrated ones did (such as Passe-Carreau getting her car serviced, Passe-Montagne getting his shoe fixed, etc.).

Legacy 
People who grew up watching the program as children are termed the "Passe-Partout generation".  In 2005, Les Francs-Tireurs dedicated one of their episodes to Passe-Partout (with Marie Eykel present), while in 2006, Ici Louis-José Houde, a show tracing a comedic history of Québec television, aired an episode tracing the history of children's shows in Quebec, with much of the show dedicated to Passe-Partout, and Eykel, Pimparé and L'Heureux all present.

It was also announced early in 2006 that work was underway on putting together DVD releases of the first two seasons of the show, in reaction to the sales of pirate versions of the series on eBay (with bids reaching the hundred dollars by the time the auction was canceled).  Initially Télé-Québec was not interested in re-broadcasting the series, nor in producing a DVD. Eykel and L'Heureux obtained the broadcast rights to the first 125 episodes. The DVD was produced by both actors, Télé-Québec, and Alliance Atlantis Vivafilm.

The DVD was released on November 21, 2006, nearly selling out on first day sales.

On September 29, 2009, a CD album entitled Génération Passe-Partout was released with some of the songs recorded by current artists from Quebec.

Revival
The cast of the 2019 revival includes Élodie Grenier as Passe-Partout, Gabrielle Fontaine as Passe-Carreau, Jean-François Pronovost as Passe-Montagne, Danielle Proulx as Grand-Mère and Widemir Normil as Fardoche.

The first episode of the revived series aired on February 25, 2019, with viewership reaching 707,000.

References

Television shows filmed in Quebec
1970s Canadian children's television series
1980s Canadian children's television series
1990s Canadian children's television series
1977 Canadian television series debuts
1993 Canadian television series endings
Television shows filmed in Montreal
Canadian preschool education television series
Canadian television shows featuring puppetry
Ici Radio-Canada Télé original programming
Télé-Québec original programming
2019 Canadian television series debuts